The 2014 SEAT León Eurocup was the fourth season of the SEAT León Eurocup, and the first since 2010. The season was contested over six race meetings – with two races at each meeting – starting on 3 May at the Nürburgring and concluding on 2 November at the Circuit de Barcelona-Catalunya.

Baporo Motorsport drivers were able to take the top two places in the drivers' championship, with Pol Rosell taking the championship after a second-place finish in the first race at the final round of the season. Rosell achieved six podium finishes during the season, with only one win at the Salzburgring, but only missed the points on two occasions. His team-mate Manuel Gião also scored points in ten races, taking five podium finishes and two victories, coming at Monza and at the final round. Gião's final round victory allowed him to overtake Julien Briché, driving for his eponymous JSB Compétition team, for the runner-up position. Briché won races at Spa-Francorchamps and Monza, but finished fewer races. Stefano Comini and Stian Paulsen each won three races during the season, but runs of non-scoring races each cost them a shot at the championship, while the only other race winner was Ferenc Ficza, who won at Silverstone.

Teams and drivers

Race calendar and results
The series supported the Euroformula Open and International GT Open championships at all events except the Salzburgring, where the Eurocup was part of the support package for the World Touring Car Championship, at the FIA WTCC Race of Austria.

Championship standings

References

External links
Official Website of the SEAT León Eurocup 

SEAT León Eurocup seasons
SEAT Leon Eurocup
SEAT Leon Eurocup